KKDO (94.7 FM) is a commercial radio station licensed to Fair Oaks, California, and serving the Sacramento radio market. The station calls itself "Alt 94.7" and it programs an alternative rock radio format. The Audacy, Inc. outlet has its transmitter off Rosebud Lane in Citrus Heights.  Its studios are located in North Highlands (with a Sacramento address).

KKDO broadcasts in the HD Radio format.  Its HD2 subchannel carries "Channel Q," an Audacy format of LGBTQ talk and EDM dance music.

History

In Carson City
KKDO is considered to be a "move in" station, because it moved about 80 miles in be a part of the larger, more lucrative Sacramento radio market.  The station signed on the air in Carson City, Nevada, on November 25, 1970, as KNIS.  It was owned by Western Inspirational Broadcasters, Inc., and broadcast from McClellan Park with a Christian radio format. In 1984, Western Inspirational Broadcasters sold the station to Sapphire Broadcasting, though it would retain Western's religious format.

In 1990, a new KNIS, now the key station of the Pilgrim Radio religious network, went on the air at 91.3 FM. 94.7 became KRWR at the same time and asked the Federal Communications Commission (FCC) for permission to move from Carson City to Fair Oaks, California. The station became KIZS in 1992 and KTHX-FM in 1994 as the FCC decided on the Fair Oaks proposal.  In 1996, the Susquehanna Radio Company, acquired the newly minted Sacramento market station for $14.95 million. Susquehanna would sell the station to Entercom a year later.

Smooth Jazz

In 1998, 94.7 entered the Sacramento market with a smooth jazz format as KSSJ. KSSJ proved to be a success story in the market, where it established itself as one of the top-rated stations in several Arbitron ratings reports since its sign on. It was the successor to KSSJ at 101.9 FM, which ended when American Radio Systems sold 101.9 to EXCL Communications (now part of Entravision Communications) and the KSSJ intellectual property went to Entercom.

In late February 2010, KSSJ dropped its "Smooth Jazz" slogan, re-branding itself as simply "94/7 KSSJ" while also changing its logo and adding additional adult contemporary and urban AC vocals to the playlist, transitioning to Smooth AC.

Alternative rock
On March 3, 2010, the KSSJ website, as well as e-mails sent to station listeners, indicated that the format would change at noon that day.  Management stated "the audience for the station can no longer sustain the business of the station."

At 12:01 p.m. on March 3, KSSJ switched to a gold-based alternative rock format, branded as "Radio 94-7."  The call letters were also changed to KKDO. The first song on "Radio" was Smashing Pumpkins' "Today". This is a return to the alternative rock format for Sacramento after longtime alternative station and sister station KWOD flipped to all-90s music in 2009. 

On April 6, 2018, KKDO rebranded as "Alt 94-7", this time adopting a more current-based Alternative presentation in line with Entercom’s “Alt” branding. In September 2020, the station added DJs syndicated from other alternative stations across the country as part of a nationalization of the format by Entercom.

KKDO-HD2
On October 11, 2018, KKDO launched a dance/EDM format on its HD2 subchannel, branded as "Out Now". On November 1, 2018, the station rebranded as "Channel Q".

Previous Logo

References

External links

KDO
Modern rock radio stations in the United States
Radio stations established in 1970
1970 establishments in California
Audacy, Inc. radio stations